The 2016 Troy Trojans football team represented Troy University in the 2016 NCAA Division I FBS football season. They were led by second-year head coach Neal Brown and played their home games at Veterans Memorial Stadium in Troy, Alabama. The Trojans were members of the Sun Belt Conference. They finished the season 10–3, 6–2 in Sun Belt play to finish in a two-way tie for third place. They were invited to the Dollar General Bowl where they defeated Ohio. This was the first 10-win season ever for Troy since joining the FBS in 2001.  It was also the first season that Troy had received a Top 25 ranking since joining the FBS in 2001.

Schedule
Troy announced their 2016 football schedule on March 3, 2016. The 2016 schedule consist of six home and seven away games in the regular season. The Trojans will host Sun Belt foes Appalachian State, Arkansas State, Georgia State, and New Mexico State, and will travel to Georgia Southern, Idaho, South Alabama, and Texas State.

Rankings

Game summaries

Austin Peay

at Clemson

at Southern Miss

New Mexico State

at Idaho

Georgia State

at South Alabama

Massachusetts

Appalachian State

Arkansas State

at Texas State

at Georgia Southern

vs. Ohio–Dollar General Bowl

References

Troy
Troy Trojans football seasons
LendingTree Bowl champion seasons
Troy Trojans football